The 1912 Auckland Rugby League season was the 4th official year of the Auckland Rugby League. The season commenced on 11 May, with the start of the First Grade competition.

It saw six teams competing for the First Grade title after the addition of the Manukau Rovers who were formed after a meeting in Onehunga in March. The season commenced on 11 May with the start of the first grade competition.

Newton Rangers secured their first Auckland first grade club title after they defeated Ponsonby United in the penultimate round at Eden Park on 13 July.

News

Manukau Magpies formed 
Manukau held a meeting in Onehunga in March. They decided to field a senior team and two junior teams. James Rukutai was their captain and after his death in 1940 the trophy for the minor premiers was named after him. Teams still play for it today.

Hobsonville Pirates
A club was formed in Hobsonville, West Auckland at the start of the season. They decided on the name of Hobsonville Pirates. They fielded a team in the second grade. The had the use of a paddock on Midgeley's farm for games and teams had to make their way their by launch from the city centre on Saturday mornings. They failed to field a side in 1913 and then in 1914 they fielded a side in the 3rd grade before folding at the end of the season.

Club teams and grade participation

Myers Cup (First Grade Championship)
Thirty regular season matches were played with nearly all fixtures being played at Eden Park (25 in total). With the Devonport Domain being used for four North Shore Albions home matches, and one match at Ellerslie.

Myers Cup standings
{|
|-
|

Myers Cup results

Round 1 
Images were published in the New Zealand Graphic of the City Rovers v North Shore Albions match.

Round 2 
In the match between North Shore and Newton, Joe Bennett broke his leg and missed the rest of the season. He returned to captain the side at the start of the 1913 season.

Round 3

Round 4 
Eden only had nine players for their match with North Shore and after trailing by 33 points to 0 they threw in the proverbial towel and the match ended at that point. No point scorers or match description was published in the NZ Herald or Auckland Star. In the match between Ponsonby and Newton Charles Savory was ordered from the field for “rough and tumble” play just before fulltime and a match his side won by 16 to 6. He had earlier scored 2 tries and kicked a conversion.

Round 5

Round 6 
The rugby league code showed that it was still struggling in its infancy to always organise itself properly with City only managing to field 12 players and the Auckland Star noted in its match report that several players “wore wrongly coloured uniforms”, and that the match was 45 minutes late kicking off. Also noticeable was the Newton and Eden result where Newton ran in 12 tries but only managed to convert one of them. Goal kicking in general was relatively poor and was shared amongst the teams with it not uncommon to see 3 or 4 players used.

Round 7

Round 8

Round 9

Round 10

Top scorers
There were multiple instances of points being unattributed. As such the following try scoring and point scoring lists are incomplete. Games and/or teams with unattributed points are as follows: North Shore try and penalty v Manukau (R3), North Shore 33 points v Eden (R4), Manukau try v North Shore (R3), Newton try v Manukau (R5), Newton 2 tries v Manukau (R10), Eden 25 points v City (R10), City 5 points v Eden (R10). This amounts to 84 points unattributed out of 773 points scored in total.

Lower grades and exhibition matches

Second Grade

The Points table at the end of the first round (which was published) and additional known results. Only 19 scores were reported therefore the points for and against are only tallies from those matches. The table also included the championship final which saw Ponsonby defeat Otahuhu 15-9.
{|
|-
|

Third Grade
Ponsonby B beat Ponsonby A in the final match 17-5 to win the competition. There were two rounds of matches played prior to the competition beginning. Only 8 rounds were played (7 matches for each team) and only 8 scores were reported, including none from Northcote's games. The standings were published after 7 rounds however which showed the teams wins and losses to that point. As a result the points for and against only includes those reported.
{|
|-
|

Fourth Grade
The competition was played over 7 rounds. Only 16 match scores were reported out of 26 matches played. The for and against as a result are incomplete as are the win loss records.
{|
|-
|

Exhibition match

Representative season
The team to play Thames-Goldfields to begin the season was a considerably weakened one. Several players named originally in the NZ Herald did not actually make the trip and the match day line up as reported in the Thames News was a very different one with many players on debut for Auckland.

Auckland v Thames-Goldfields

Auckland v New Zealand
Sid Riley the former Australian rugby international who was playing club football in Auckland for Ponsonby at the time was listed to play for Auckland in the match. However he played for New Zealand instead. A photo was published of the Auckland team. They are from left to right Ernie Asher, George Seagar, Jim Griffen, ?, ?, Bob Mitchell, ?, ?, ?, ?, Harry Fricker, ?, and ?.

Auckland B v Thames

Auckland v Hawke’s Bay (Northern Union C.C.)
The Auckland team featured Harold Hayward who was from the Thames district which was affiliated to Auckland Rugby League. He had been a member of the combined Thames-Goldfields team which had played Auckland earlier in the season.

Auckland B v Waikato
Early in the game Skeates for Auckland broke "several ribs" and had to leave the field. Then near the end of the match another Auckland player sprined a toe and left the field leaving Auckland a player short.

Auckland v Rotorua
On 3 August Auckland played Rotorua in Rotorua and they also played Lower Waikato at Eden Park. The later match was listed in some quarters as a B team though it was filled with New Zealand internationals.

Auckland B v Lower Waikato

Auckland v Wellington (Northern Union C.C.)
Due to the Rotorua and Thames leagues being affiliated with the Auckland Rugby League the Auckland team contained two players from each sub league. Namely Riki Papakura and Rukingi Reke from Rotorua and Harold Hayward and his brother Morgan Hayward from Thames.

Auckland v Waikato

Auckland v New Zealand Māori

Auckland v New South Wales
Auckland won their first victory over an ‘international’ side when they defeated New South Wales by 10 points to 3. The game was marred by several acts of violence with the visiting side said to be at fault repeatedly. Near the end of the match Sid Deane was sent off for punching Billy Curran.

Auckland v New South Wales
New South Wales reversed their earlier loss with a comprehensive win over a disappointing Auckland effort. Charles Dunning and Bob Mitchell who had both been named to play originally were forced to withdraw due to illness and were replaced by Harry Fricker and Jim Griffin.

Auckland representative matches played and scorers
The following list is complete in terms of points scored however the match with Rotorua did not have team lists published with only the three point scorers from the match known (Hardgrave, Tobin, and Webb).

References

External links
 Auckland Rugby League Official Site

Auckland Rugby League seasons
Auckland Rugby League